Thomas Victor "Vic" Trood (16 December 1891 – 16 October 1977) was an Australian rules footballer who played with University in the Victorian Football League (VFL).

Trood was born in Sale and was the son of Charles Trood and had a well known brother and Sale footballer, Arthur.

Trood was involved in a nasty incident in round 4 of the 1911 VFL season when he was knocked unconscious. Carlton's Martin Gotz was charged and found guilty of assault. This charge was later quashed on Appeal.

Trood and his brother, Arthur both played football for Sale after World War I.

He was a former President of the Gippsland Football League and was instrumental in the formation of the Latrobe Valley League in 1954, as the league's inaugural President.

The best and fairest award in the Gippsland Football League has been known as the Trood Award since 1928 after Victor Trood initially donated this award and continued to do so for many years in his role as a Sale FC delegate and Gippsland FL president.

References

External links

1891 births
Australian rules footballers from Victoria (Australia)
University Football Club players
Sale Football Club players
1977 deaths
People from Sale, Victoria